The Unidad Especial de Intervención (UEI) is the Police Tactical Unit of the Guardia Civil, the Spanish gendarmerie.

Overview
UEI was established in 1978 to respond to high risk situations and including those involving hostages. Its motto is Celeritas et Subtilitas Patrio. The exact scope of UEI operations and total number of personnel are not published. In 2008, on the occasion of the Unit's 30th anniversary, its commanding officer revealed that the UEI had until then participated in 375 operations, in which 563 hostages had been freed and 640 people arrested, of whom 141 belonged to terrorist groups. These operations included 11 high-sea missions against drug-trafficking. He also revealed that due to the demanding selection process, of the 26 applicants that had applied to join the Unit that year, only four had been admitted. The Unit has also intervened in 18 prison riots involving hostages. The UEI is part of the European Union-sponsored ATLAS Network.

Equipment

Uniform
In assaults operations:
 Green assault costume with the unit's shield on the right sleeve at shoulder height and the Spanish flag on the left sleeve at shoulder height.
 Black balaclava that gives the informal nickname to the unit: black faces.
 Bulletproof vest.
 Tactical vest, dress on the previous one.
 Helmet with ballistic protection visor for urban combat.
 Protection of elbows, knees and shin guards.
 Boots and gloves.

In boarding operations:
 Black dry suit of naval intervention with autoinflatable life jacket. Shield and flag on the sleeves.
 Black balaclava.
 Bulletproof vest.
 Tactical vest.
 Protection of elbows, knees and shin guards.
 ProTec lightweight half-head polyethylene hull.
 Boots and gloves.

In riot control operations:
 Equipment for riot control.

Weapons
These are a few of them:

 Heckler & Koch USP 
 Glock 17 Gen 3 equipped with a tactical flashlight
 Heckler & Koch MP5SD3
 FN P90
 Heckler & Koch G36K 
 Heckler & Koch G41
 Heckler & Koch HK416 
 Heckler & Koch HK417 
 Barrett M82
 Accuracy International Arctic Warfare

Organization
The Unit is commanded by an active lieutenant colonel of the Civil Guard and its divided on:
 Operative Groups
 Technical Support Groups.

See also

 Grupo de Operaciones Especiales (Spain)

References

Civil Guard (Spain)
Police tactical units
Special forces of Spain
ATLAS Network